The 2001 Western Illinois Leathernecks football team represented Western Illinois University as a member of the Gateway Football Conference during the 2001 NCAA Division I-AA football season. They were led by third-year head coach Don Patterson and played their home games at Hanson Field in Macomb, Illinois. The Leathernecks finished the season with a 5–5 record overall and a 4–3 record in conference play. Western Illinois played a ten-game schedule instead of the typical eleven-game schedule in Division I-AA, as they were unable to schedule an eleventh opponent before the season began.

Schedule

References

Western Illinois
Western Illinois Leathernecks football seasons
Western Illinois Leathernecks football